Naija News is a Nigerian online newspaper. It was launched in 2016 by Opemipo Olawale Adeniyi.

History 
Naija News was established in 2016 and by Polance Media Limited. In 2021, the newspaper moved its operations to Ikoyi in Lagos.

Offerings 
In June 2019, a news section in the Hausa language to serve the Hausa-speaking world in Nigeria, Ghana, Niger and the rest of Hausa speakers in West Africa was launched.
The news platform also has a project, 'EcoWatch' that covers climate change.

References

External links 
 

2016 establishments in Nigeria
Publications established in 2016
Companies based in Lagos
Newspapers published in Lagos
English-language newspapers published in Africa
Online newspapers published in Nigeria